Johann-Wolfgang-von-Goethe-Gymnasium Chemnitz is a public secondary school in Chemnitz, Saxony, Germany, for grades 5–12. It is one of seven secondary schools operating in Chemnitz, Bernsdorf

Its name changed in the past multiple times, and the school is now named after the famous German poet and natural scientist Johann Wolfgang von Goethe. One can find several statues of him all over the building. 
It is near a netto which is the only attraction.

Johann-Wolfgang-von-Goethe-Gymnasium has an annual average enrollment of about 666,5 students and 46 teachers. It offers a variety of 18 extracurricular activities. The principal of the school is Steffen Morgner (until summer 2021) and the assistant principal is Veronika Pißler.

Throughout the years, the school faced several changes to its school system. In the early years, the school separated boys and girls and served as a common board school to teach children for eight years. The school went coed in 1949, still distinguishing in Bernsdorf School I and II, and added grades 9 and 10 in 1959. After the German reunification in 1989, schools in East Germany adapted the West German curriculum mostly. After closing both Bernsdorf schools and opening the Bernsdorf secondary school in 1992, the school was renamed Johann-Wolfgang-von-Goethe-Gymnasium on 23 March 1993. Its name hasn't changed since then.

The school was severely damaged in World War II. No damage was done during World War I but in 1945 all the windows, the tower on top of the building, and parts of the roof were destroyed. Several classrooms caught fire during these bombings. A few repairs were done following the war, but it was completely rebuilt in 1972: the roof was restored and a new heating system was installed. Further refurbishment work started in 1999 and was completed in 2000.

History

Schools in Chemnitz-Bernsdorf

The first school in Bernsdorf 
The first school in Chemnitz-Bernsdorf opened on 30 October 1822. 
At the beginning of the 19th century, the village commune Bernsdorf became a suburb of the urban community Chemnitz. In 1805, school attendance became compulsory and the suburb was forced to build a school for the children. But with only 300 citizens in total living in Bernsdorf, the community was not able to finance and maintain their own school building. The children were required to attend a school in the urban core.
Pastor Gottlob Heinrich Hunger bought a small house with his own funds to offer public education for children from Bernsdorf. The school building was inaugurated on 30 October 1822 and 60 students attended it at the beginning.
Because of poverty during the industrialization in the middle of the 19th century, parents took their children to school in the factories. The minors had to work 12 to 14 hours a day and were able to attend school after that. The family had to pay around 6 groschen for each child.
On account of the devastating situation in the school system, a committee with pastor St. Johannis at the head, started to supervise schools in Chemnitz. Children who didn’t attend school were reported to the royal Land court. Schools were included in the town's budget and supported children from poor families with teaching materials. This way, every child was given a chance to pursue education.
The number of students being taught at the small building rose so that it eventually became too small.

The second school in Bernsdorf 
In 1862, a new school building was built and inaugurated on 4 September 1862.
The committee worked out a plan to teach 113 students in four different classes:

By reason of the continuously rising number of residents the school building had to be enlarged. In 1872, the building was extended with another two classrooms.
More than 220 children attended the school, all being taught by teacher Knorr. To overcome the situation, school fees were doubled and students not coming from Bernsdorf were suspended. In 1872, a second teacher, Mr. Nestler, was hired.

The third school in Bernsdorf 

Even though the second school was extended in 1872, the population of Bernsdorf rose rapidly so that the four classrooms were not big enough. Another house was built in 1899 and opened on 24 August 1899. It was located right behind the second schoolhouse and offered another 4 classrooms. Both schools were now combined to one school complex. Led by principal Julius Nobis, seven teachers taught all children coming from Bernsdorf.
This third school building is nowadays a preschool.

Construction of the new school building 
In 1907, Bernsdorf completely gave up its autonomy and became a district of Chemnitz. The borders vanished and it became necessary to build one big schoolhouse.

The city council advertised a competition for planning and designing the new building. 104 concepts were turned in and the design "Fritz und Elly" by the architects Adolf Alfred Christian Zapp and Erich August Leo Basarke persuaded the jury the most. They received a prize of 3000 marks. The architect's office was put in charge of building the schoolhouse by signing the contract on 3 February 1909. They planned to finish construction work around Easter 1910.
Having cost more than 750,000 marks, the school was inaugurated on 25 April 1910. 846 girls and 1345 boys enrolled and started school the next day.

The school between 1910 and 1933 
Although the students and their families enjoyed the new school, it was facing problems with absent students. 871 students were absent for at least three days during the school year and 82 children were not able to attend classes for more than three weeks. The school administration counteracted by making the students go to swimming and sports classes, and offering them milk and a warm breakfast to lower the number of absences.
Due to World War I, many teachers were drafted to the army. Classes were consolidated and cancelled in the winter of 1916 and 1917. As a result of the war, 6 out of the 46 teachers died.
In 1919, the city council passed a law that majorly changed the school system. The tripartite division in lower, middle, and higher board school was abolished and the common board school was introduced. Classes were reduced from 45 students to 35 students and school fees were abolished. As part of this, pedagogues started (an experimental study with classes whose students were able to study and work on group projects with other students).

The school during the National Socialism 
After the fascist takeover in 1933, the school system had been reorganized. In the spirit of the National Socialism and therefore the community, all school types supporting self-determination were abolished. The Bernsdorf School was reorganized and became a board school but still separated girls and boys.
Everyday school life was influenced by the ideology such as the, "Führer principle" and unquestioning obedience. The Parents Council did not have much influence anymore and the youth associations, Hitlerjugend and Bund Deutscher Mädchen, were included in the school system. The regime tried to unionize teachers in the "National-sozialistischen Lehrerbund". They were trained politically and informed about the changes in the school system. Non-Aryan teachers had been suspended as well as teachers were forced to become members of the NSDAP.
The interior design was changed and walls were decorated with Nazi symbols, photos of Adolf Hitler, the Reich's flag, and National Socialist publications. Some of the wall decorations were part of an exhibition that changed on a regular basis.

School life changed tremendously during World War II. Young teachers were conscripted in 1939 and 1940 so that older teachers taught two classes at the same time. Additionally, students from the Diesterweg School had been incorporated. Parts of the basement had been converted to be used as a dugout and were located where the fitness room is nowadays. After the raid on Poland and a growing fear of chemical warfare, the decontamination squad was deployed in the basement of the school building as well.
In January and February 1940, the school had to close because of the freezing temperatures in the classrooms and the absence of heating fuel. Students were required to keep a diary with their experiences about the war and to collect donations. The school garden was used to cultivate vegetables to feed the people.
In the school year of 1942 and 1943, sirens were installed on the roof to warn students and people living near the school. If possible, students were sent home after hearing the pre-alarm. At the beginning of 1945, the first refugees came and two classrooms of the boys school were furnished for the homeless. Parts of the girls school served as a sickbay. For 37 classes with up to 40 students each, there were only 20 rooms available anymore. Lessons were shortened or sometimes even shut down because of missing heating fuel.
With the beginning of air raids, the school was completely shut down. The bombings destroyed the protectory right next to school and killed 39 children. The windows, the whole tower and parts of the roof were destroyed. Several classrooms caught fire. In the following months, only teachers were allowed to enter the school building to start clearing work. 22 students who attended the school died during the war.

The school from 1949 – 1989 

In the summer of 1945, craftsman started to replace the broken windows in the rooms that could still be used and renewed the roof provisionally. The school opened on 1 October 1945 and had 13 rooms for 32 classes. Lessons were shortened and other schools were used to teach all students. A shack was set up on the school yard that could be heated during the winter months since the heating in the actual schoolhouse had not been usable for years. Coldness, hunger, and malnutrition made many of the children sick. On 22 November 1945, as part of the denazification, 22 teachers were dismissed. Lay teachers were hired and had to spread the democratic ideas.
In the following years, new teachers were employed and as early as in 1946, the first curriculum was published. The school was still being rebuilt and in 1949 the school went coed. Its names changed from Boys School and Girls School to Bernsdorfer School I and II.
After the founding of the GDR, teachers were required to influence students politically as given in the curriculum and dealing with special topics, for example the GDR anniversary and Liberation day. School life was characterized by extracurricular activities. The organisation Young Pioneers has been funded on 13 December 1948 to influence the children politically. 
In 1959, the school type changed to a ten-class general-education polytechnic secondary school. Grades 9 and 10 were now added to the curriculum and compulsory for all students. The socialist government added classes, such as astronomy and introduction to the socialistic production.
Since 1972, the school building was being rebuilt completely. The roof was being renewed and a new heating system was being installed. Parts of the first floor of the building were reshaped to serve as a refectory. This all happened during the lessons. The building was all solely provisional and was never really finished.
As part of the Cold War, the GDR enacted a new lesson plan and included military education for grades 9 and 10. A mayor of the National People's army went to the school to instruct the students with film material. They were taught on how to use gasmasks, give first aid, and much more.

The school after the reunification 

After the reunification of FRG and GDR, extensive changes happened in schools. At the beginning of the 1990s, school officials were retired, organizations like the Young Pioneers and the Free German Youth, liquidated and the interest in the Russian language vanished. The East German school system adapted the West German curriculum mostly to suppress the partial political influence from the schools.
In 1992, both Bernsdorf schools closed and the Bernsdorf secondary school opened in September 1992. 970 students attended the coed school and were taught by 55 teachers in 30 classes. The new situation of teaching students in two different secondary levels was a tough change for all the students and teachers. Yet, both students and teachers adapted to the new curriculum quickly.
On 23 March 1993, the school was renamed Johann-Wolfgang-von-Goethe-Gymnasium and hasn't changed its name since. The same day, the booster club had its first general meeting. In the same year, the city council decided to refurbish the outside of the school completely. Building work was finished in the spring of 1994.
In the school year of 1997 / 1998, Johann-Wolfgang-von-Goethe secondary school and Carl-Friedrich-Gauß secondary school combined to offer a better educational development. It was now possible to outsource grades 7 through 12 to the former Gauß secondary school in spring 1999 to start reconstructing the inside of the building. Grades 5 and 6 were taught in the Heinrich Heine elementary school and construction work started in fall 1999. After only one year, all refurbishment work was done and 850 students and 70 teachers started the school year of 2000 / 2001 in the new building.
In 2002, the city council decided to close other secondary schools. The Werner-Heisenberg secondary school combined with the Goethe school until 2006. In the same year, former principal Jürgen Auerbeck retired and Steffen Morgner (former principal of the Heisenberg-Gymnasium) became principal of the Goethe school. After introducing study trips to secondary level II students in 2004, the school started offering extracurricular activities for students in the year of 2007. Nowadays, the school offers 22 of these activities.

Campus 

The school building was built in 1910. Throughout the years, the school has been refurbished numerous times, especially after World War II. The 57 meter wide school consists of five floors and a basement.

In addition to the 19 regular classrooms are a number of specialist rooms for various classes. Science rooms, like physics, biology, and chemistry, are located in the north wing of the school building. Fitted with electric and extra water hookups, they offer storage rooms to hold class-specific materials. Computer cabinets can be found on the 3rd, 4th, and 5th floors, each having 14 to 17 PCs and projectors to be used by the teachers. Specialized rooms for arts and music classes are located in 1st and 4th floor (respectively). The school has one language laboratory, consisting of 24 work stations with one cassette deck and headset each. Students can listen to cassette tapes and repeat it to improve their pronunciation while the teacher is able to listen to each student individually.

Johann-Wolfgang-von-Goethe-Gymnasium has furthermore a number of rooms for extracurricular use: a library with more than 8,000 books on the top floor, several study hall rooms, and seminar rooms. The cafeteria is located on the first floor, offering students lunch after 4th and 6th block, and snacks throughout the day.

Academics

School concept 
Johann-Wolfgang-von-Goethe high school has a concept that involves students, teachers, and parents to fulfill six goals: 
 School helps students
 Maintenance of tradition
 Cooperation with partners
 Enjoyment of learning
 Development of competence
 Extracurricular activities

Education 

The secondary school offers 24 classes taught from 5th through 12th grade. 46 teachers educate 666 students in 35 classes.
Each class has its own class teacher. If possible, classes do not get mixed and class teachers remain in the same class until 10th grade. Students have at least one class a week with their class teacher.
After 10th grade, students have to select their advanced courses and classes are getting mixed by their choices. Johann-Wolfgang-von-Goethe high school offers six different advanced courses besides mathematics and German which are obligatory.

Green: available advanced courses (have to be approved by the ministry of education and cultural affairs), students are required to select German or mathematics and one other advanced course in secondary level II. Students have to choose 2 elective classes in secondary level II

Extracurricular activities 
Johann-Wolfgang-von-Goethe High School offers a variety of 22 different extracurricular activities for students. All leisure facilities are held by teachers, students, or external educators and are voluntary.
Most activities are offered once a week (on week days) and take place at the school building. The activities are scheduled in the afternoon and usually start after 7th or 8th class period.

Student company S-GmbH GoetheMedia 
Johann-Wolfgang-von-Goethe high school has a company that is run by students. Its main purpose is to offer students who are interested in computer sciences a possibility to extend their knowledge and to work in a team.
Being founded in 1997, the company started off with only a few computers and was named "WebDesignStudio". The next years, the student company mainly focused on web design and programming computer games and software. In 2005, the field of programming was being terminated and "Senioren ans Netz", a computer class for elder people started. Over the next years, GoetheMedia became well known in Chemnitz because of various appearances in TV shows and newspaper articles. 
At the moment, the student company consists of 12 members with Jasmin Herzog as chief executive officer and Mr. Yannic Warias as deputy chief executive.

Booster club 
The booster club of the high school, named "Freunde des Johann-Wolfgang-von-Goethe-Gymnasiums Chemnitz e.V." is a non-profit organization that supports the school and its students. 
In 1993, the booster club was founded and consisted of 60 members who established three basic principles because of missing financial support by the commune:
 Financial and material support of the high school
 Financial and material support of students
 Preservation of public relations
The yearbook is being pre-financed and published by the booster club as well. The organization honors students with outstanding educational achievements at the end of each school year with certificates and gift coupons. The notion is to motivate students while the award has more of an ideational than a material character. Another award is given to students who improve their grades from first to second semester significantly.
The "Goethe Taler" (a ceramics statuary) is awarded to the student with the highest GPA in 12th grade by a celebrated character from Chemnitz.

The GAPP
Since 1999 the Johann-Wolfgang-von-Goethe-Gymnasium has taken part in the German American Partnership Program (GAPP). The GAPP supports long-term school partnerships between schools in the United States of America and Germany. 
The first partner school of the Johann-Wolfgang-von-Goethe-Gymnasium was the Mt. Spokane High School in Mead, Washington. The Partnership ended in 2005.

In 2006, the Johann-Wolfgang-von-Goethe-Gymnasium began its partnership with the Fargo North High School in Fargo, North Dakota.
Between the two schools students exchanges of small student groups take place regularly every other year. Since the beginning of the partnership four visits and four return visits have taken already place.

The exchanges are about four weeks long. During the first three weeks the exchange students stay in host families and have to attend classes at the partner school. The remaining days the students and their accompanying teachers spend in a big city like New York City or Chicago.

Alumnus 

After 12th grade, students graduate from high school and receive their diplomas at a ceremony. Since the school became a secondary school in 1996, Johann-Wolfgang-von-Goethe high school had 14 students with an average of 1.0:

Johann-Wolfgang-von-Goethe high school offers an online database with information of students who graduated from the school. It is possible to enter name, surname, final year, e-mail-address, and phone number and browse through existing information. All entries are voluntary.

References

Further reading 
 Festausschuß, Bernsdorfer Schulen. Festschrift zum 50-jährigen Bestehen der Bernsdorfer Schule (1960)
 Lehmann, H. Nachrichten über das Schulwesen in Gablenz. Im Auftrag des Schulvorstandes verfaßt. (1996)
 Pehnke, Andreas. Die Bernsdorfer Schule in Chemnitz. Reformpädagogische Versuchsarbeit an 1912 bis 1933 in Jahrbuch für Historische Bildungsforschung Band 7 (2001)
 Pehnke, Andreas. Zur Montessori – Rezeption im Gemeinschaftsklassenzweig der Bernsdorfer Versuchsschule in Chemnitz während der Weimarer Republik in Das Kind. Halbjahresschrift für Montessoripädagogik (2001)
 Pehnke, Andreas. "Ich gehöre in die Partei des Kindes!" Der Chemnitzer Sozial- und Reformpädagoge Fritz Müller (2002)
 Pehnke Andreas. Chemnitzer Schulen unterm Hakenkreuz in Chemnitz in der NS-Zeit: Beiträge zur Stadtgeschichte 1933–1945. Aus dem Stadtarchiv, Band 10 (2008)
 Poste, Burkhardt. Schulreform in Sachsen. Eine vergessene Tradition deutscher Schulgeschichte (1993)
WebSite "www.goethemedia.de" (2018)

Buildings and structures in Chemnitz
Schools in Saxony